Bowa or Bova, also known as Baba Khaneh, may refer to:
 Bowa-ye Olya
 Bowa-ye Sofla